Blow the whistle may refer to:

 Blow the Whistle (album), a 2006 album by Too Short
 "Blow the Whistle" (song)
 refereeing a sports match
 Whistleblowing, reporting inappropriate activity to outsiders